Metavirus is a genus of viruses in the family Metaviridae. They are retrotransposons that invade a eukaryotic host genome and may only replicate once the virus has infected the host. These genetic elements exist to infect and replicate in their host genome and are derived from ancestral elements unrelated from their host. Metavirus may use several different hosts for transmission, and has been found to be transmissible through ovule and pollen of some plants.

Metavirus contains five families of the Ty3/Gypsy element with either one or two open-reading frames; these families are mdg1, mdg3, blastopia, 412, and micropia. Each of the five families contains either one or two open-reading frames, gag3 and/or pol3. There is evidence to support that amino acid deprivation in the elements host genome has frequently caused a frameshift towards the Ty3 element. Metavirus corresponds with the Ogre/Tat gene lineage.

Morphology 
Species of Metavirus are single-stranded RNA retrotransposons. They have an icosahedral and linear conformation and are not enclosed in an envelope. Their diameter is approximately 50 nm and they are usually between 42 and 52 nm in length. These genetic elements contain a core and capsid.

Species 
The following species are recognized:

 Arabidopsis thaliana Athila virus
 Arabidopsis thaliana Tat4 virus
 Bombyx mori Mag virus
 Caenorhabditis elegans Cer1 virus
 Cladosporium fulvum T-1 virus
 Dictyostelium discoideum Skipper virus
 Drosophila buzzatii Osvaldo virus
 Drosophila melanogaster 412 virus
 Drosophila melanogaster Blastopia virus
 Drosophila melanogaster Mdg1 virus
 Drosophila melanogaster Mdg3 virus
 Drosophila melanogaster Micropia virus
 Drosophila virilis Ulysses virus
 Fusarium oxysporum Skippy virus
 Lilium henryi Del1 virus
 Saccharomyces cerevisiae Ty3 virus
 Schizosaccharomyces pombe Tf1 virus
 Schizosaccharomyces pombe Tf2 virus
 Takifugu rubripes Sushi virus
 Tribolium castaneum Woot virus
 Tripneustis gratilla SURL virus

Evolution 
Because of their high mutation and recombination rate and their ability to conduct horizontal gene transfer, the evolutionary history of many retroelements may be challenging to trace (Benachenhou et al., 2013). Scientists often look to the genomes of Metavirus to compare nucleic acid sequences to the sequences of other viruses, constructing lineages and proposing common ancestors.

Multiple taxa of Metavirus have genomic sequence that are homologous to other genera of Metaviridae and a suggest common ancestor and/or coevolution. Scientists often look at capsid proteins for evidence of Metavirus evolution. Much of the lineage of Metavirus remains unsolved and is presently being researched.

Studies 
Mascagni et al. (2017) conducted researched to find homologs and identify strands in sunflower species. In the experiment, DNA was extracted from various helianthus species and the genomes of retrotransposons were identified using BLASTX analysis. Phylogenetic trees were constructed using neighbor-joining clustering method and a bioinformatic pipeline was constructed to allow genomic analysis. Two elements, SURE and Helicopia, were identified and placed into the Gypsy and Copia superfamilies, respectively. Thus, the SURE element belongs to the Gypsy group, of the Ogre/Tat lineage, of the genus Metavirus. Further analysis led Mascagni et al. (2017) to identify mutations and conclude that the Metavirus lineage evolved before Sirevirus. Mascagni et al. (2017) also found evidence that the SURE elements and Helicopia elements had hybridized, potential for new lineages.

Nefedova and Kim (2009), conducted a study on Drosophila melanogaster to further identify lineages of Metavirus. Homologs were identified from previously extracted DNA of retrotransposons and Drosophila melanogaster and phylogenetic trees were constructed. Metaviruses possess the env gene, allowing them to be infective, which Nefedova and Kim (2009) concluded was obtained from horizontal gene transfer from baculoviruses. Metavirus contains the roo element which is thought to have been obtained from gene transfer from Errantivirus, or more likely, the two genera share a common ancestor.

References

External links
 ICTV Report: Metaviridae
 
 Descriptions of Plant Viruses 

Metaviridae
RNA reverse-transcribing viruses
Virus genera